(English: March of Oriamendi), is the anthem of the Carlist movement. The name of the anthem stems from the battle of Oriamendi which took place in 1837 during the First Carlist War.

History
It was composed by José Juan Santesteban to celebrate the Liberal victory.
When the Carlists eventually won, they appropriated the melody.

The original lyrics were in Basque. Over the years, several versions of "Oriamendi" have been in use. The red berets are part of the Carlist uniform.

The Decree 226/1937 of the Burgos Junta recognizes as  Oriamendi and the anthems of Falange Española and the Spanish Legion ordering that they should be listened to standing in homage to the Fatherland and the fallen.
A decree from 1942 reinstates the songs and orders that, in official events, the playing of the anthem and the songs must be saluted with a "national salute" (Roman salute), or a military salute if the event is exclusively military.

Lyrics

"God, Fatherland, King" (sometimes "God, Fatherland, Fuero, King") is the Carlist motto.

 (Basque ) is another battle of symbolic importance to Carlists.

Original lyrics

References

External links
 http://www.requetes.com
 Marcha de Oriamendi 
 Marcha de Oriamendi 
 Marcha de Oriamendi (instrumental)

First Carlist War
History of Navarre
Political party songs
Carlism
Basque literature
Cantos nacionales
19th-century songs

la:Carlismus#Hymnus Carlistarum